The Ruffian Stakes is a Grade II American thoroughbred horse race for fillies and mares ages four-years-old and older run over a distance of one mile on a dirt track scheduled annually in early May at Belmont Park in Elmont, New York.

Race history 

The race is named in honor of the U.S. Racing Hall of Fame filly, Ruffian who broke down in a match race with the 1975 Kentucky Derby winner Foolish Pleasure on 6 July 1975 at Belmont Park and was humanely destroyed the following day.

The following year the New York Racing Association scheduled the inaugural running of the Ruffian Stakes on 9 October 1976 as a  miles race for fillies and mares, three-year-old and older. The event was won by Revidere who defeated the Argentine bred Bastonera II by 14 lengths on a sloppy track in a time of 2:01 flat. Revidere was sired by Reviewer the same sire of the ill-fated Ruffian. After the first running the event was classified as Grade I.

In 1977 the distance of the event was decreased to  miles and the conditions of the event were changed to a handicap thus the name of the event became the Ruffian Handicap.  In 1990 the distance was reduced once again to  miles.

The 2001 running of the Ruffian Handicap was cancelled due to the September 11th terrorist attacks.

In 2010 and 2011 the event was moved to the Saratoga Race Course in Saratoga Springs, New York during the regular summer meeting and was run as the Ruffian Invitational Handicap over a distance of  miles. 

In late 2011 the American Graded Stakes Committee of the Thoroughbred Owners and Breeders Association downgraded the event to Grade II for 2012 however, NYRA did not schedule the event.

The event was moved to Aqueduct Racecourse in 2013 and held in April over a distance of one mile and then returned to Belmont Park in 2014 and scheduled in May where it was run on the undercard of the Man o' War Stakes on Mother's Day. That year the event became the Ruffian Stakes again in 2014 and the conditions were changed to the current format of fillies and mares ages four-years-old and older allowed to enter. Fiftyshadesofhay won the race, giving John Velazquez his sixth win in the race, currently the leading jockey to have won this event.

Outstanding mares to have won this event include Sky Beauty who won this race in 1994 with 130 pounds, Bayakoa who won the event in 1989, and Lady's Secret who won it twice, in 1985 and 1986, after which she was awarded the Eclipse Award for U.S. Horse of the Year. Genuine Risk, the second filly to win the Kentucky Derby, won it in 1980.

The 2020 winner Monomoy Girl would go on and win the Breeders' Cup Distaff at Keeneland and would be crowned U.S. Champion Older Female Horse.

Records
Speed record:
1 mile – 1:34.05  Cavorting  (2016)  
 miles – 1:40.16  Tough Tiz's Sis  (2008)  
 miles – 1:46.80   Lady's Secret  (1986) 
 
Margins:
 14 lengths – Revidere (1976)
  lengths – Tough Tiz's Sis (2008)

Most wins:
 2 – Lady's Secret (1985, 1986)

Most wins by a jockey:
 6 – John Velazquez (1996, 2004, 2006, 2010, 2013, 2014)

Most wins by a trainer:
 3 – Claude R. McGaughey III (1991, 1992, 1995) 
 3 – Robert J. Frankel (2003, 2004, 2007)

Most wins by an owner:
 2 –  Cynthia Phipps  (1982, 1992)
 2 – Eugene V. Klein (1985, 1986)
 2 – Karl Watson & Paul Weitman (2008, 2014)
 2 – Godolphin Racing (2005, 2015)

Winners

Notes: 

§ Ran as an entry

† In the 1987 running Sacahuista finished first, but was disqualified for interfering with other runners in the straight. Coup De Fusil was declared the winner and Sacahuista was placed third. However, since all three placegetters were part of an entry Coup De Fusil, Clabber Girl and Sacahuista the payout for first place was $2.80 as the entry's odds were 2/5.

See also
List of American and Canadian Graded races

References

Graded stakes races in the United States
Grade 2 stakes races in the United States
Mile category horse races for fillies and mares
Horse races in New York (state)
Recurring sporting events established in 1976
1976 establishments in New York (state)